The zodiac is a coordinate system of twelve "signs", based on twelve constellations used in astronomy and astrology.

Amusement park rides 

 Zodiac (ride), a ride at Thorpe Park, United Kingdom
 Zodiac, a double Ferris wheel

Film 

 Zodiac-films, a 1970s series of Danish erotic films
 The Zodiac Killer (film), 1971 film about the Zodiac Killer, released while the serial murderer was still actively sending letters
 Zodiac Rapist (1971), a pornographic horror film loosely based on the crimes of the Zodiac Killer
 The Zodiac (film), a 2005 film by Alexander Buckley about the Zodiac Killer
 Curse of the Zodiac (2007) horror film, a loose retelling of the original murders
 Zodiac (film), a 2007 film by David Fincher based on a book about the Zodiac Killer
 Zodiac: Signs of the Apocalypse, a 2014 Canadian science fiction disaster television film
Awakening the Zodiac (2017), a mystery drama about the Zodiac Killer

Literature 

 Zodiac (true crime book), a 1986 book by Robert Graysmith about the Zodiac killer
 Zodiac (novel), a 1988 novel by Neal Stephenson about environmentalism
 Short Trips: Zodiac (2002), an anthology about Doctor Who
 Zodiac (comics), several groups of supervillains in the Marvel Universe
 Zodiacs (Hunter × Hunter), a group of characters in the manga series Hunter × Hunter

Music

Artists 

 Zodiac (band), a Soviet Union, then Latvian musical group
 Zodiac (rock band), a German hard/blues rock band
 Maurice Williams and the Zodiacs, a band

Albums 

 Zodiac (Cecil Payne album)
 Zodiac (Electric Six album) (2010)
 Zodiac (soundtrack), the soundtrack from the 2007 film
 The Zodiac: Cosmic Sounds, a 1967 psychedelic concept album

Songs 

 "Zodiac", a song by Yaron Chadad representing Israel in the Eurovision Song Contest 1992
 "Zodiac", a 1999 song by Richie Havens from Time
 "Zodiac", a song by Ryan Leslie
 "The Zodiac", a song by Kamelot
 "Zodiacs", a song by Roberta Kelly
 "Zodiac", a song by Melvins
 "Zodiac", a song by God Is an Astronaut from their self-titled album

Music venues and labels 

 The Zodiac, a former name of the O2 Academy Oxford, a nightclub and music venue in Oxford, England
 Zodiac Records (New Zealand), a record label
 Zodiac Records, a list of record labels
 Zodiak Free Arts Lab, an experimental music venue West Berlin

Organizations 

 Zodiac Aerospace, a corporation specializing in the production of aerosafety systems
 Zodiac Entertainment, an American television production/distribution company
 Zodiac Marine & Pool, a corporation specializing in the production of Zodiac rigid inflatable boats
 Zodiac Milpro, a company producing rigid inflatable boats for military and professional clients
 Zodiac Watches, a brand of watches

Places 
 Zodiac, a climbing route on the El Capitan rock formation in Yosemite Valley
 Zodiac, Missouri
 Zodiac Springs, a spring in Missouri
 Zodiac, Texas

Transport 
 AMD Zodiac, a light sport aircraft
 Zephyr Zodiac, the luxury variant of the Ford Zephyr line of cars
 Zodiac inflatable boat
 Zodiac (schooner), a historic schooner homeported in Seattle, Washington, USA

Other uses 
 The Zodiac Killer, a never identified serial killer in the San Francisco area, California
 Heriberto Seda, a serial killer known as the "New York Zodiac Killer"
 Brutus Beefcake or "the Zodiac", American retired professional wrestler
 Tapwave Zodiac, a palmtop computer
 Zodiac (cipher), a Korean encryption algorithm
 Zodiac: Orcanon Odyssey, a video game

See also 

Tierkreis (Stockhausen) ("Zodiac" in German), a composition for 12 music boxes by Karlheinz Stockhausen
Zodac, a character in the He-man and Masters of the Universe mythology